Parc de Parilly is an urban park in the communes of Bron and Vénissieux, Lyon Metropolis. The park includes numerous sport facilities, including a running track, a hippodrome, and basketball courts. It is accessible by Lyon Metro Line D at Parilly station, by line T2 of the tramway at Parilly Université–Hippodrome station, and by bus 39.

History 
In 1926, Lyon's mayor Édouard Herriot wanted to create a park in the east part of the city. The mayor of Bron at the time disapproved of the project because he thought that there was more important work that should be done, most notably the construction of housing for workers in the industrial district. However, in 1937 the city council approved the park and held a contest to select a designer. Pierre Bellemain was chosen to design the park, but the start of the second world war temporarily put the project on hold.

The  was inaugurated in 1965.

Facilities 
Previously managed by the department of Rhone, the park has been managed by Lyon Metropolis since 1 January 2015. The park is known for its hippodrome and its numerous sports fields, including 11 football fields, 7 basketball courts, 2 running tracks, 1 rugby pitch, 3 handball courts, 1 baseball diamond, and 1 cricket pitch.

See also 
 2013 IPC Athletics World Championships
 Parks in Lyon

References

External links 

 Official Bron website for the park 
 Official Vénissieux website for the park 
 Official Ville de Lyon website for the park 
 Official website for the park 

Parks in Lyon
1937 establishments in France